Horst Bernhardt (born 26 January 1951 in Leipzig, Saxony, died 18 October 2021) is an East German bobsledder who competed in the late 1970s. He won a gold medal in the four-man event at the 1978 FIBT World Championships in Lake Placid.

References
Bobsleigh four-man world championship medalists since 1930

Living people
Sportspeople from Leipzig
German male bobsledders
Olympic bobsledders of East Germany
Bobsledders at the 1976 Winter Olympics
1951 births
20th-century German people